Herman I (died April 11, 924) was Archbishop of Cologne from 890 to 924. He was the son of Erenfried I of Maasgau, of the Ezzonian dynasty.
As chancellor of Zwentibold, King of Lotharingia, he helped to execute in 911 his kingdom's annexation to West Francia. In 921, he was a signatory of the Treaty of Bonn and, in 922, participated in the Synod of Koblenz.

He died in 924 and was buried in the Hildebold Dom in Cologne.

9th-century births
924 deaths

Year of birth unknown
Ezzonids
Archbishops of Cologne
9th-century archbishops
10th-century archbishops

House of Limburg-Stirum
Counts of Germany
10th-century Latin writers